Dentarene rosadoi is a species of sea snail, a marine gastropod mollusk in the family Turbinidae, the turban snails.

Description

Distribution

References

Turbinidae
Gastropods described in 2005